Ukpong may refer to:

 Moses Ukpong, Nigerian politician
 Ikot Ukpong, village in Nigeria